Anderson Leite Morais (born 4 May 1993) is a Brazilian footballer who plays as a midfielder for Liga MX club Juárez, on loan from Chapecoense.

Club career
Anderson Leite was loaned to Costa Rican side Deportivo Saprissa in January 2017.

Career statistics

References

External links

1993 births
Living people
Footballers from São Paulo
Brazilian footballers
Brazilian expatriate footballers
Association football midfielders
Campeonato Brasileiro Série A players
Campeonato Brasileiro Série B players
Campeonato Brasileiro Série D players
Iraty Sport Club players
Londrina Esporte Clube players
Atlético Clube Goianiense players
Associação Chapecoense de Futebol players
Deportivo Saprissa players
FC Juárez footballers
Liga FPD players
Liga MX players
Expatriate footballers in Costa Rica